Tessalit Cercle is an administrative subdivision of the Kidal Region of Mali. The administrative centre is the village of Tessalit. The cercle is divided into communes, and below this, quarters/villages. As of 2009 the cercle had a population of 16,289.

Communes
The Tessalit Cercle contains the following rural communes:

 Adjelhoc (Aguelhok) 
 Tessalit
 Timtaghene

References

Cercles of Mali
Kidal Region